Group A of EuroBasket 2017 consisted of , , , Iceland,  and . The games were played between 31 August and 6 September 2017. All games were played at the Hartwall Arena in Helsinki, Finland.

Standings

All times are local (UTC+3).

Matches

Slovenia v Poland

Iceland v Greece

France v Finland

Poland v Iceland

Greece v France

Finland v Slovenia

France v Iceland

Slovenia v Greece

Finland v Poland

Iceland v Slovenia

Poland v France

Greece v Finland

Slovenia v France

Greece v Poland

Finland v Iceland

References

Group A
International basketball competitions hosted by Finland
2017–18 in Polish basketball
2017–18 in Greek basketball
2017–18 in French basketball
2017–18 in Finnish basketball
2017–18 in Icelandic basketball
2017–18 in Slovenian basketball
International sports competitions in Helsinki
2010s in Helsinki